James Steele (born 11 March 1950) is a Scottish former football centre back who played professionally in Scotland, England and the United States. He helped Southampton win the 1976 FA Cup Final.

Playing career

Early career
Steele was born in Edinburgh; after leaving school, he was a trainee mechanical engineer with the National Coal Board. As a 15-year-old he was playing for a village team in his native Scotland when Tynecastle Boys Club, who were affiliated to Scottish First Division team, Hearts, spotted his talent and signed him up as an apprentice.

Dundee
Dundee signed him as a 17-year-old and he made his debut in the first team with a solitary appearance in the 1967-68 season against Stirling Albion at Annfield, playing in front of just 600 spectators. The following season, he made just 5 appearances, but soon became a first team regular playing alongside Gordon Wallace, John Duncan, Jocky Scott and Ian Phillip. Even at this early stage in his career, he was considered a hard man and usually came out of a tackle with the ball, but his toughness was allied to skill.

The highlight of his Dundee career was in their 1971–72 UEFA Cup run, when Dundee beat German side FC Koln, but went out to AC Milan despite a 2-0 victory in the home leg. These high-profile games brought him to the attention of English clubs and soon Leeds United and Southampton (alerted by their former player and scout, Campbell Forsyth) expressed an interest. Dens boss Davie White accepted an offer of £80,000 from Saints manager Ted Bates and Steele was off to The Dell.

In his 5 years at the club, he made 86 first team appearances, scoring 5 goals, and gained a reputation as a tall, granite-hard defender with a bad disciplinary record.

Southampton
His transfer to English first division club Southampton for a club record fee of £80,000 was shrouded in secrecy as manager Ted Bates moved swiftly to secure Steele's services from under the noses of many bigger clubs. He made his debut for Southampton on 29 January 1972 in a 4-1 victory at home over Nottingham Forest.

He had an aggressive, no holds barred attitude which soon made him a favourite with Saints' fans but often got him into trouble with referees. He was a versatile player and was able to play at left-back, as a sweeper, or in the centre of defence and soon became a fixture in the first eleven, rarely missing a game for the next 4 seasons except when under suspension for disciplinary reasons.

The pinnacle of his career came in Southampton's 1976 FA Cup Final victory over Manchester United. His performance at the centre of Saints' defence, alongside Mel Blyth, earned him the man of the match award.

This honour was the peak of his career, and after the first few games of the 1976-77 season, he was replaced by Malcolm Waldron. He was briefly loaned out to Rangers in November 1976, playing 5 games, including the Old Firm derby against Celtic but did not fit into Jock Wallace's plans and returned to The Dell.

After his return to Southampton, he seemed to have re-established himself in the team being virtually ever-present from mid-December onwards, including appearing in 5 FA cup matches before Saints were eliminated by the team they had beaten in the previous season's final, Manchester United, who went on to win the 1977 FA Cup. He was sent off in the replay on 8 March against United after a series of bad-tempered exchanges with Jimmy Greenhoff, scorer of United's 2 goals.

On 16 March 1977, Saints were playing Anderlecht in the European Cup-winners' Cup when Jim made a mistake in defence allowing Van der Elst to get past him to score the winning goal. This error, coupled with the sending-off, led to a falling-out with the manager Lawrie McMenemy, who was intent on a wholesale rebuilding of the team in order to gain promotion back to Division 1, and Jim made his final appearance for Saints away to Nottingham Forest on 22 March 1977.

In total he made 201 appearances for Southampton, scoring just 2 goals.

United States
In April 1977, he moved to the United States and, although still relatively young, he never played again in British football. He spent 3 years with Washington Diplomats in the NASL followed by a short spell at Memphis Rogues and the Chicago Sting. He served as player-coach during the 1978 NASL indoor season while head coach Gordon Bradley was away scouting. On 21 September 1979, he signed on loan from the Diplomats with the Pittsburgh Spirit of the Major Indoor Soccer League. He tore the anterior cruciate ligament in his left knee two games into the season. This led to a legal mess in which the Diplomats sued the Spirit for the loss of Steele. The Diplomats then released Steele who considered suing them before signing with the Memphis Rogues on 29 May 1980. He played only seven games for the Rogues as his knee continued to hamper his playing. In 1981, he signed with the Chicago Sting, but saw no first team games.

He was employed as a foreman at an electrical plant in Washington, before returning to Britain in 1994.

Return to Britain
Having also run a bar in Washington and with friends running a pub in Southampton, it seemed natural to enter the pub trade when he returned to Britain.

He did holiday-relief management at Black Horse pub in Naunton, Gloucestershire and ran Naunton Downs Golf Club's bar for seven months before he and his partner Gill took over at the Black Bear pub in Moreton-in-Marsh, Gloucestershire. He later managed the Eastleigh District Irish Society bar in Eastleigh, Hampshire.

Honours

As a player
Southampton
 FA Cup: 1976

References

Bibliography

External links
NASL stats
NASL indoor

1950 births
Footballers from Edinburgh
Living people
Dundee F.C. players
Major Indoor Soccer League (1978–1992) players
Memphis Rogues players
North American Soccer League (1968–1984) players
North American Soccer League (1968–1984) indoor players
Pittsburgh Spirit players
Rangers F.C. players
Scottish footballers
Scottish expatriate footballers
Scottish Football League players
Southampton F.C. players
Tynecastle F.C. players
Washington Diplomats (NASL) players
Association football central defenders
Scottish expatriate sportspeople in the United States
Expatriate soccer players in the United States
FA Cup Final players